Kirkham Abbey railway station was a minor railway station serving the village of Kirkham in North Yorkshire, England on the York to Scarborough Line and was opened on 5 July 1845 by the York and North Midland Railway. It closed on 22 September 1930.

The station was originally just named Kirkham, but the 'Abbey' suffix was added on 1 June 1875, to take into account the proximity of the ruins of Kirkham Priory.

References

External links
 Kirkham Abbey station on navigable 1947 O. S. map

Disused railway stations in North Yorkshire
Railway stations in Great Britain opened in 1845
Railway stations in Great Britain closed in 1930
Former York and North Midland Railway stations
George Townsend Andrews railway stations